Elizabeth Stanton was an American Democratic politician from Fitchburg, Massachusetts. She represented the 3rd Worcester district in the Massachusetts Senate from 1953 to 1960.

References

Year of birth missing
Year of death missing
Massachusetts state senators
Women state legislators in Massachusetts
20th-century American women politicians
People from Fitchburg, Massachusetts
20th-century American politicians